Archer Avenue, sometimes known as Archer Road outside the Chicago, Illinois city limits, and also known as State Street only in Lockport, Illinois and Fairmont, Illinois city limits, is a street running northeast-to-southwest between Chicago's Chinatown and Lockport. Archer follows the original trail crossing the Chicago Portage between the Chicago River and the Des Plaines River, and parallels the path of the Illinois and Michigan Canal and the Alton Railroad. As a main traffic artery, it has largely been replaced by the modern Stevenson Expressway. 

The street was named after the first commissioner of the Illinois and Michigan Canal, William Beatty Archer. One early map of Chicago (ca. 1830) listed what may have been the future Archer Road as "The Road to Widow Brown's".

Route description
The east end of Archer begins in Chicago's Chinatown, then passes through the Bridgeport, McKinley Park and Brighton Park neighborhoods on its way to Archer Heights and Garfield Ridge.  Outside Chicago, Archer Avenue/Road passes through the villages of Summit, Justice, Willow Springs, and the southern edge of Lemont before terminating on the north side of Lockport. Between Summit and Lockport, Archer Avenue is designated as a part of Illinois Route 171.

Points of interest

Southwest of Lemont, Archer passes Cog Hill Golf & Country Club, site of numerous Professional Golfers Association tournaments.

History
Historically, this section of Archer was a part of Illinois Route 4, the original 1924 highway connecting St. Louis and Chicago. In 1926, Route 4 was rerouted to the north side of the Des Plaines River on an alignment that subsequently became U.S. Route 66, and its former route on Archer was redesignated as Illinois Route 4A. By 1939, Route 4A had been extended along most of Archer Avenue into Downtown Chicago. In 1967, Route 4A was truncated back to Summit and merged into Illinois Route 171.

Historical sites
The former site of Argonne National Laboratory and its predecessor, the University of Chicago Metallurgical Laboratory in the forest preserve near Red Gate Woods, can be entered from an access road on Archer Avenue.  This was once a secret Manhattan Project site, and is now known as the Site A/Plot M Disposal Site.  Chicago Pile-1 (CP-1), the world's first nuclear reactor, was moved from Stagg Field to this site in 1943 and renamed Chicago Pile-2 (CP-2).  The remains of CP-1, CP-2, and Chicago Pile-3 (CP-3) remain buried at this site.

A defunct Playland Amusement Park opened in mid-summer of 1950 which, at the time, was located in Willow Springs, Illinois. Back then, Willow Springs used to be an unincorporated community. The amusement park was located at 9300 West 79th Street in present-day Justice, Illinois.

In popular culture

Archer Avenue was made famous by Finley Peter Dunne in his books and sketches about the fictional saloonkeeper Mr. Dooley, whose tavern was on "Archey Road". The fictional Dooley "lived" in the real-life Bridgeport, Chicago neighborhood.

Archer Avenue is also famous as the purported haunting place of Resurrection Mary, a vanishing hitchhiker who is said to travel between the Willowbrook Ballroom and Resurrection Cemetery.

Major intersections

Notes

References

External links

Archer Avenue
Roads in Illinois
Transportation in Joliet, Illinois
Lockport, Illinois